Best of Times is a Thai romantic drama film directed by Yongyoot Thongkongtoon and released by GTH in 2009. Starring Arak Amornsupasiri, Yarinda Bunnag, Krissana Sreadthatamrong and Sansanee Wattananukul, it features the story of Keng, a young veterinarian who, during giving computer classes to a group of seniors as part of a community service sentence, comes to know an elderly couple, Jamras and Sompit, who are rediscovering romance late in life. As Keng helps Jamras and Somphit with their problems, he learns from them and forms a relationship with his former school crush and friend's ex-wife, Fai. The film received multiple national awards and was Thailand's submission to the 82nd Academy Award for Best Foreign Language Film.

Cast 

 Arak Amornsupasiri as Keng
 Yarinda Bunnag as Fai
 Krissana Sreadthatamrong as Jamrus
 Sansanee Wattananukul as Sompi
 James Alexander Mackie as Ohm

Reception 
The film topped the domestic boxoffice for a while and grossed $1.4 million in Bangkok. It received two awards for Outstanding Performance by an Actress in a Supporting Role (Sansanee Wattananukul) and Best Original Song (So I Won't Forget You), and four nominations for Best Picture of the Year, Best Director of the Year (Yongyoot Thongkongtoon), Outstanding Performance by an Actor in a Supporting Role (Krissana Sreadthatamrong), and Screenplay of the Year in the 19th Suphannahong National Film Awards .

Soundtrack 

 "จะได้ไม่ลืมกัน" ( So I Won't Forget You) by Bird Thongchai McIntyre

References

External links 
 

2009 films
Thai romantic drama films
Thai-language films
GMM Tai Hub films
Films directed by Yongyoot Thongkongtoon